EPD may refer to:

Government and politics 

 Environmental Protection Department, of the Government of Hong Kong 
 Erie Police Department, Pennsylvania
 European Partnership for Democracy, an organization promoting democracy outside the European Union
 European Progressive Democrats, a defunct political group in the European Parliament
 Evansville Police Department (Indiana)

Science and medicine 

 Enzyme potentiated desensitization
 Etch pit density
 Erythrose-4-phosphate dehydrogenase
 Eukaryotic Promoter Database
 European Pollen Database, a biological database
 Expected progeny difference

Technology and industry 

 Environmental product declaration
 Electronic paper display
 Electrophoretic deposition
 Electrophoretic display
 Equipment protective device
 Electronic personal dosimeter
 Enterprise Products

Other uses 

 English Pronouncing Dictionary, by Daniel Jones, first published 1917
 Enterprise Products, an American pipeline company
 EPD Tour, a professional golf tour based in Germany
 Epsom Downs railway station, in England
 Extended Position Description, a chess notation
 Nintendo Entertainment Planning & Development, an internal division of the video game company Nintendo